The Seletar Teleport is the third of four satellite earth station in Singapore after the Bukit Timah Satellite Earth Station in Bukit Timah, and the Sentosa Satellite Earth Station in Sentosa Island. It is located near Lower Seletar Reservoir in Yio Chu Kang, opposite Seletar Expressway (SLE). This station is managed and owned by SingTel.

See also
Singtel
Seletar

References

Earth stations in Singapore
Yishun